Petrignano is a frazione of the comune of Assisi in the Province of Perugia, Umbria, central Italy. It stands at an elevation of 212 metres above sea level on the right bank of the Chiascio River, c. 8 km east to Assisi. At the time of the Istat census of 2001 it had 2536 inhabitants.

It has a 13th-century castle.

References 

Hilltowns in Umbria
Castles in Italy
Frazioni of Assisi